John Erneley (before 1522 – 1572), of Bishops Cannings, Wiltshire, was an English politician.

He was a Member (MP) of the Parliament of England for Wiltshire in 1559.

References

1572 deaths
English MPs 1559
People from Wiltshire
Year of birth uncertain